Lesley Osmond (23 November 1921 – March 1987) was a British actress. She appeared in the 1953 West End musical The Glorious Days.

Selected filmography
 Asking for Trouble (1942)
 In Which We Serve (1942)
 We'll Meet Again (1943)
 I'll Turn to You (1946)
 The Mysterious Mr. Nicholson (1947)
 House of Darkness (1948)
 This Was a Woman (1948)
 The Story of Shirley Yorke (1948)
 Let's Have a Murder (1950)
 Chelsea Story (1951)
 Death Is a Number (1951)

References

External links

1921 births
1987 deaths
Actresses from London
English film actresses
20th-century English actresses